Cosmonaut is a 2009 Italian coming-of-age film written and directed by Susanna Nicchiarelli. It won the Controcampo Italiano at the 66th Venice International Film Festival.  It also won the Ciak d'oro for best first work.

Plot 
Cosmonaut follows a young girl named Luciana, who struggles to have her voice heard in a youth communist group dominated by men. She comes up with the platform to mobilize communism in her town by bringing recognition to the Soviet's progress in the space race. As a strong and stubborn female character, she struggles to balance new relationships and her role as her epileptic brother's supervisor.

Cast 
Miriana Raschillà as Luciana Proietti
 Pietro Del Giudice as  Arturo Proietti
 Michelangelo Ciminale as Vittorio
 Chiara Arrighi as  Fiorella
 Valentino Campitelli as  Angelo
Claudia Pandolfi as Rosalba
 Sergio Rubini as  Armando
 Susanna Nicchiarelli as  Marisa
Angelo Orlando as  Leonardo

See also    
 List of Italian films of 2009

References

External links

2000s coming-of-age comedy-drama films
2009 films
Italian coming-of-age comedy-drama films
Films set in 1963
Films directed by Susanna Nicchiarelli
2009 directorial debut films
2000s Italian films
Fandango (Italian company) films